Goddard Hall may refer to:

Goddard Hall (New Mexico State University), Las Cruces, New Mexico, listed on the National Register of Historic Places
Goddard Hall (New York University), New York, New York, a residential college
Goddard Hall (Tufts University), Medford, Massachusetts

See also
Goddard House (disambiguation)